Jack Ford may refer to:

Characters
Jack Ford, a character in When the Boat Comes In, portrayed by James Bolam
Jack Ford, a character in the video game Madden NFL 18 and Madden NFL 20

People
Jack Ford (politician) (1947–2015), mayor of Toledo, Ohio
John Gardner Ford (born 1951), American business executive, nicknamed "Jack"; son of American president Gerald R. Ford
Jack Ford (journalist), American television personality
Jack Ford (rugby union) (1906–1985), rugby union player who represented Australia
John Ford (1894–1973), American film director sometimes called "Jack Ford"

See also
John Ford (disambiguation)
Ford (surname)